The 2006 Supercopa de España was a two-leg Spanish football match played on 17 and 20 August 2006. It was contested by 2005–06 La Liga champions Barcelona and 2005–06 Copa del Rey winners Espanyol. Barcelona won 4–0 on aggregate.

Match details

First leg

Second leg

See also
Derbi barceloní

References
List of Super Cup Finals 2006 RSSSF.com

Supercopa de Espana Final
Supercopa de España
Supercopa de Espana 2006
Supercopa de Espana 2006